Bulacan's 1st congressional district is one of the seven congressional districts of the Philippines in the province of Bulacan. It has been represented in the House of Representatives of the Philippines since 1916 and earlier in the Philippine Assembly from 1907 to 1916. The district consists of the provincial capital city of Malolos and adjacent municipalities of Bulakan, Calumpit, Hagonoy, Paombong and Pulilan. It is currently represented in the 19th Congress by Danilo A. Domingo of the National Unity Party (NUP).

Representation history

Election results

2022

2019

2016

2013

2010

See also
Legislative districts of Bulacan

References

Congressional districts of the Philippines
Politics of Bulacan
1907 establishments in the Philippines
Congressional districts of Central Luzon
Constituencies established in 1907